Gabriel Edmonston (March 29, 1839 – May 16, 1918) was an American labor unionist and carpenter.

Born in Washington, D.C., Edmonston trained as a carpenter.  During the American Civil War, he served in the Confederate Army, in the First Corps, Army of Northern Virginia, being taken prisoner on four occasions, and wounded twice.

After the war, Edmonston returned to Washington.  He came to believe that carpenters needed to form labor unions in order to improve their pay and working conditions, and in 1881, he formed a local union.  He argued that it should admit all carpenters, regardless of ethnicity, nationality or religion.  Later in the year, he played a role in founding the United Brotherhood of Carpenters, becoming its first president.

In 1881/1882, Edmonston served as president of the UBC.  The UBC affiliated to the Federation of Organized Trades and Labor Unions, and Edmonston served as its secretary in 1884/1885.  While in office, he was the first to propose an eight hour day.  The federation transformed into the American Federation of Labor, with Edmonston becoming its first treasurer, serving until 1889, when he stood down to devote his time to his local union in Washington.  Around this time, he also served as official carpenter to the United States House of Representatives.

References

1839 births
1918 deaths
American carpenters
American Federation of Labor people
American trade union leaders
Confederate States Army soldiers
People from Washington, D.C.